Cymbidium canaliculatum, commonly known as the channelled boat-lip orchid, tiger boat-lip orchid, native cymbidium or tiger orchid is a plant in the orchid family and is endemic to Australia. It is a clump-forming epiphyte with large, greyish green pseudobulbs, each with up to six curved, deeply channelled leaves and up to sixty fragrant, variably coloured flowers that often have spots and blotches and a white to cream-coloured labellum with red markings. This orchid usually grows in the forks or hollows of trees and is found from New South Wales to the northern parts of Western Australia.

Description
The flowers are olive green, yellow, brown or purple often with spots, blotches or both. The side lobes are erect and the middle lobe curves downwards with a warty or hairy upper surface and two ridges along its midline. Flowering occurs between September and October.

Taxonomy and naming
Cymbidium canaliculatum was first formally described in 1810 by Robert Brown who published the description in Prodromus Florae Novae Hollandiae et Insulae Van Diemen. The specific epithet (canaliculatum) is derived from the Latin word canaliculus meaning "canal" or "channel".

Distribution and habitat
The channelled boat-lip orchid grows in the forks or hollows of trees in woodlands and drier forests in the Kimberley region of Western Australia, the northern parts of the Northern Territory, (including Melville Island) and from Cape York Peninsula in Queensland south to the Hunter River in New South Wales.

References

External links 

canaliculatum
Plants described in 1810
Endemic orchids of Australia
Orchids of Queensland
Orchids of the Northern Territory
Orchids of New South Wales
Orchids of Western Australia
Taxa named by Robert Brown (botanist, born 1773)